The Vancouver Film Critics Circle Award for Best Actress is an annual award given by the Vancouver Film Critics Circle.

Winners and nominees

2000s

2010s

2020s

Notes

References

Vancouver Film Critics Circle Awards
Film awards for lead actress